The Henry "Harry" Charles Pernot House is a historic house at 119 Fayetteville Road in Van Buren, Arkansas.  Built in the early 20th century, it is an eclectic and late example of blended Queen Anne and Second Empire architecture.  It has asymmetrical massing and a tower, characteristic of the Second Empire, along with a Queen Anne porch that features turned posts and a spindled valance.  Harry Pernot, who built it, was mayor of Van Buren, 1904–1909.

The house was listed on the National Register of Historic Places in 2017.

See also
National Register of Historic Places listings in Crawford County, Arkansas

References

Houses on the National Register of Historic Places in Arkansas
Houses completed in 1904
Houses in Crawford County, Arkansas
National Register of Historic Places in Crawford County, Arkansas
Buildings and structures in Van Buren, Arkansas